The GAZ-31105 Volga is an automobile manufactured by the Gorkovsky Avtomobilny Zavod (GAZ, Gorky Automobile Plant) from 2004 to 2009 as a generation of its Volga marque.

GAZ-31105 was a second stage of the GAZ-3110's modernisation, though the designation was applied to cars produced from January 2004, the mechanical features were introduced almost a year earlier, and certain external ones were available in separate batches as standard or optional in others.

Technical details
The most striking difference was the new fascia which now featured a drooping hood with the radiator grille integrated into it as a single unit. New block headlights, inspired by the 3111 surrounded it. This effectively restored the nostalgic corporate look that GAZ was re-fitting to its model range. Inside the car featured a new digital instrument cluster on the dashboard. The steering column became more horizontal and greater headroom was made possible due to thinner seats.

It was the GAZ-31105 the final 24-derived Volga that restored its reputation. Despite its obvious age, assembly quality of these final cars reached acceptable level.

Versions
In 2006 the standard engine selection was added with a Chrysler DOHC 2.4 litre engine.

In 2005 GAZ introduced a long-wheelbase GAZ-311055 luxury model, with a new interior that included wooden trim. The latter feature became standard on models produced from 2007 onwards when GAZ gave the car a minor facelift. Among the changes were completely new taillights and a conversion to Euro III standard with the introduction of its new 2.4 litre 152 hp ZMZ-40525 engine, complementing the Chrysler engine, with which the archaic ZMZ-4021 and ZMZ-4062.10 were phased out. The GAZ-31105 was available only as a saloon, with the estate continuing with the old GAZ-3110 styling.

Following the introduction of the Volga Siber in 2008 GAZ hoped to fully finish production on both the GAZ-3102 and the GAZ-31105 by 2010. The base design of both cars still traced its roots to the GAZ-24, thus ending a successful production run of 40 years.

External links
 Official page on the GAZ website (archived)

Cars of Russia
GAZ Volga
Cars introduced in 2004
Full-size vehicles